In the Red is a 2006 album by Tina Dico.

Track listing

Three songs on the album are new versions of previously released songs. An early version of "My Mirror" was released on Fuel (2001), while "Warm Sand" and "Room with a View" were originally released on the album Notes (2003).

Special edition
In 2007, a 2-disc 'Special Edition' of In the Red was released, featuring 11 tracks from an acoustic show at the Copenhagen JazzHouse recorded on April 24, 2006, plus two B-sides. "Don't Think Twice, It's All Right" is listed as "Don't Think Twice" on the CD's back cover.

Charts

References

2006 albums
Tina Dico albums